The Turner Diaries is a 1978 novel by William Luther Pierce, published under the pseudonym Andrew Macdonald. It depicts a violent revolution in the United States which leads to the overthrow of the federal government, a nuclear war, and, ultimately, a race war which leads to the systematic extermination of non-whites and Jews. All groups opposed by the novel's protagonist, Earl Turner—including Jews, non-whites, "liberal actors", and politicians—are murdered en masse.

The Turner Diaries was described as being "explicitly racist and anti-Semitic" by The New York Times and has been labeled the "bible of the racist right" by the FBI. The book was greatly influential in shaping white nationalism and the later development of the white genocide conspiracy theory. It has also inspired numerous hate crimes and acts of terrorism, including the 1984 assassination of Alan Berg, the 1995 Oklahoma City bombing, and the 1999 London nail bombings.

Synopsis
The protagonist, Earl Turner, takes part in the apocalyptic overthrow of the United States federal government (referred to as "the System" throughout the novel). Turner and his fellow insurgents wage a race war which begins in North America and spreads to the rest of the world.

Plot

A framing device which takes place in 2099 (100 years after the events depicted) gives the novel's main text a historical context, which is presented as the journal of Earl Turner, an active member of a white revolutionary movement known as the Organization. After the federal government has confiscated all civilian firearms in the country under the Cohen Act, Turner and his colleagues take their movement underground to wage a guerrilla war against the System, which is depicted as being under Jewish control. The "System" begins by implementing numerous repressive laws against various forms of prejudice: by making it a hate crime for white people to defend themselves when crimes are committed against them by non-white people, even after all weapons have been confiscated; and pushing for new surveillance measures to monitor its citizens, such as requiring them to possess a special passport at all times to permanently monitor where individuals are. The "Organization" starts its campaigns by committing acts such as the bombing of the FBI headquarters, then carrying on a relentless, low-level campaign of resistance, assassination, and economic sabotage throughout the United States.

Turner plays a large part in activities in the Washington, D.C. area. When the President of the United States delivers a speech denouncing racists and demanding that all members of the Organization be brought to justice, Turner and other Organization members launch mortars into the streets of Washington from far away, forcing the President and other government officials to be evacuated. In another scene, Turner watches an anti-racism parade on television in which whites who are not part of the parade are pulled aside and beaten (sometimes to death) by non-white marchers; the march eventually turns into a full-scale riot. Turner's exploits lead to his initiation into the "Order": a secret rebel group that consists of an elite group of masterminds of the revolution. The Order is secretly leading the Organization and their existence remains unknown both to ordinary Organization members and the System. Later, Turner's hideout is raided by law enforcement. During an ensuing gun battle with authorities, everyone in the unit manages to escape but Turner is captured after nearly being killed. He is arrested and sent to a military base for interrogation by the FBI and an Israeli intelligence officer. He is tortured in an effort to coerce the release of information, but resists. The interrogators fail to extract the most valuable pieces of information from him, lacking awareness of the existence of the Order. However, he does reveal some information to them. Months later, other members of the Order rescue him from the prison. They inform him that he will be punished in the future for failing to resist while in captivity. He acknowledges the authority of the Order and pledges to accept whatever punishment they impose, whenever they impose it.

Eventually, the Organization seizes physical control of the nuclear weapons at Vandenberg Air Force Base in Southern California and targets missiles at New York City and Tel Aviv. While in control of California, the Organization ethnically cleanses the area of all non-Aryans by forcing them into the East, which is still controlled by the System. Meanwhile, hundreds of thousands of African Americans are forced into the desert to cause an economic crisis on the System's welfare system and all Jews are beaten, lynched, or shot. The resulting racial conflict in the east causes many whites to "wake up" and begin fleeing to Southern California, which becomes a white sanctuary. This deliberately fomented racial conflict, referred to as "demographic warfare", starts to bring in new recruits to both the Organization and the Order. During this time, the Organization raids a black sanctuary and discovers a cannibalism operation where blacks kidnap, butcher, and eat whites.

The Organization raids the houses of all individuals who have been reported to be race traitors in some way (such as judges, professors, lawyers, politicians, clergy, journalists, entertainers, etc.), and white people who defiled their race by living with or marrying non-whites. These individuals are dragged from their homes and publicly hanged in the streets in Los Angeles in an event which comes to be known as the "Day of the Rope" (August 1, 1993). Most of these public executions are filmed for propaganda purposes. The Organization has little use for most white "mainstream" Americans. Those on the left are seen as dupes or willing agents of the Jews. Conservatives and libertarians are regarded as merely self-interested businessmen or misguided fools, because, the Organization states, the Jews "took over according to the Constitution, fair and square." Turner and his comrades save their special contempt for the ordinary people, who are seen to care about nothing beyond being kept comfortable and entertained. Once the Organization instigates a nuclear war, the Organization opens compounds where food and shelter are available—but those seeking admittance are given a bayonet and told to come back with "the freshly cut head of a non-white person;" those unable or unwilling to pay such an "admittance price" are left to starve, as their death would "improve the race."

The Organization then uses both its southern Californian base of operations and its nuclear weapons to open a wider war in which it launches nuclear strikes against New York City and Israel, initiates a nuclear exchange between the US and the Soviet Union, and plants nuclear weapons and new combat units throughout North America. Many major U.S. cities are destroyed, including Baltimore and Detroit. While the United States is being engulfed in a nuclear civil war, governments all over the world fall one by one, and violent anti-Jewish riots break out in the streets. After the nuclear weapons are launched against Israel and Tel Aviv is destroyed, the Arabs take advantage of the opportunity and proceed to swarm into Israel, mostly armed with clubs and knives, and kill all of the Israelis. The governments of France and the Netherlands collapse, and the Soviet Union falls apart while experiencing a surge in anti-Semitic violence. Meanwhile, the United States is put in a state of absolute martial law and transformed into a military dictatorship. The United States government decides to launch an invasion of the Organization's stronghold in southern California. The leaders of the Order now inform Earl Turner of his punishment for having failed to resist his Jewish interrogators during his captivity: he must pilot a crop duster equipped with a nuclear warhead and destroy the Pentagon in a kamikaze-type suicide-strike, before the invasion can be ordered.

The epilogue summarizes how the Organization went on to conquer the rest of the world and how all non-white races were eliminated. Africa was invaded; all of its black inhabitants were killed. Puerto Ricans (described as a "repulsive mongrel race") were killed and Puerto Rico was recolonized. After China attempts to invade European Russia, the Organization attacks with nuclear, chemical, radiological, and biological weapons, which render the entire continent of Asia uninhabitable and rife with "mutants". In the United States, the last remaining non-whites are hunted down, along with all of the individuals who are involved in organized crime (such as the Mafia). One of the last steps in the Organization's victory is its truce with the remainder of the American military's generals, who agree to surrender if the former swears not to harm them or their immediate families. The Organization gladly accepts. The epilogue concludes with the statement that "just 110 years after the birth of the Great One, the dream of a white world finally became a certainty... and the Order would spread its wise and benevolent rule over the earth for all time to come."

Publication history
The Turner Diaries was originally published in a serial form in the National Alliance publication Attack! between 1975 and 1978, with one chapter released per issue during this period. Enthusiastic reactions among racist sympathizers led Pierce to self-publish the story as a paperback in 1978. Artist Dennis Nix contributed to the illustrations. The main story was originally set in the 1980s; Pierce changed it to the 1990s when the series was compiled to be published as a book in 1978.

The Turner Diaries was initially only sold via mail order from the National Alliance headquarters in West Virginia. It had sold 200,000 copies by the late 1990s according to self-estimates generally considered reliable by scholars. Other estimates have gone higher, giving a figure of 500,000 copies sold as of 2000.

Commentary 
John Sutherland, in a 1996 essay for the London Review of Books, wrote that The Turner Diaries is "not the work of a Holocaust-denier (although Pierce gives us plenty of that) so much as a would-be Holocaust-repeater."
The Simon Wiesenthal Center calls it a "hate book". The book has received criticism from The New York Times which noted its influence on white supremacists.
Kathleen Belew has pointed out links between the  book's "day of the rope" theme and elements of the 2021 United States Capitol attack.

Political influence

Analysis 
The Anti-Defamation League identified The Turner Diaries as "probably the most widely-read book among far-right extremists; many [of them] have cited it as the inspiration behind their terrorist organizing and activities." The Policy on the Classification of Hate Propaganda, Sedition and Treason of the Canada Border Services Agency has classified The Turner Diaries as hate-propaganda literature that cannot be imported to Canada.

The phrase "day of the rope" has also become common in white nationalist and alt-right Internet circles, referring to an event in the novel where all "race traitors" are publicly hanged.

White supremacist terrorism 
The following terrorist attacks have been inspired by The Turner Diaries:

The Order (1983–84) was a white supremacist, terrorist organization which named itself after the political organization which is discussed in The Turner Diaries (1978). The Order murdered three people, including the talk radio host Alan Berg, and committed numerous robberies, counterfeiting operations, and acts of violence in an effort to provoke a race war in the United States.
Timothy McVeigh, who was convicted for his role in the Oklahoma City bombing in 1995, was found with pages from The Turner Diaries after the attack. His attack closely resembled the bombing of the FBI's headquarters in the novel.
John William King was convicted of dragging James Byrd, an African American, to his death in Jasper, Texas, in 1998. As King shackled Byrd's legs to his truck, he was reported to have said, "We're going to start The Turner Diaries early."
David Copeland, a British neo-Nazi who killed three people in a bombing campaign against London's black, Asian, and gay communities in April 1999, quoted from The Turner Diaries while being interviewed by police.
A copy of The Turner Diaries and other neo-Nazi propaganda were found in the home of Jacob D. Robida, who attacked three men at a gay bar in New Bedford, Massachusetts, in 2006. Robida fled, killing a hostage and a police officer before committing suicide.
 A copy of The Turner Diaries and neo-Nazi propaganda and items which are associated with white supremacy and Nazism were found in the house of Zack Davies, who was convicted of a racist murder attempt in Mold, Flintshire, UK, in September 2015.
 The National Socialist Underground used the Turner Tagebücher in forming at least part of their ideological basis. Members Uwe Böhnhardt, Uwe Mundlos, and Beate Zschäpe murdered nine immigrants between September 9, 2000, and April 25, 2007. A copy of the Turner Tagebücher was found on the trio's scorched hard drive after Böhnhardt and Mundlos committed suicide and set fire to their van on November 4, 2011. The Turner Tagebücher has been banned in Germany since April 2006.

Removal from sale 
In late 2020, online bookstore Amazon removed all new and used print and digital copies of The Turner Diaries from its bookselling platform, including all subsidiaries (AbeBooks, The Book Depository), effectively stopping sales of the title from the digital bookselling market. Amazon listed the title's connection with the QAnon movement as the reason behind this, having already purged a number of self-published and small-press titles connected with QAnon from its platform. Social cataloguing and book review website Goodreads, another subsidiary of Amazon, also purged the metadata from its record for all editions of The Turner Diaries, replacing the author and title field with "NOT A BOOK" (capitalization intended), a designated moniker normally used by the platform to weed non-book items with ISBN numbers, as well as plagiarized titles, from its catalogue.

In Canada, The Turner Diaries is one of many titles considered by the Government of Canada to be "obscene" and "hate propaganda" under The Canadian Criminal Code. The title is one of numerous titles to be confiscated when discovered in postal deliveries within Canada's extensive Quarterly List of Prohibited Publications, although print copies of the book still arrive to Canadian buyers without confiscation, generally by being marked simply as "Used Book" on shipping labels rather than listing The Turner Diaries by specific title. According to Ryerson University, "Today, officials of the Canada Border Services Agency prohibit publications that they regard as obscene or as hate propaganda. Officials derive their power from Tariff Item 9899.00.00. Most of their decisions are never appealed to an open court."

See also

 Hunter (1989), another novel by William Luther Pierce
 The Iron Heel (1908) by Jack London
 The Camp of the Saints (1973) by Jean Raspail
 Judeo-Masonic conspiracy theory
 Talk Radio (1988), directed by Oliver Stone (the main character, who is based on Alan Berg, mentions the book)
 Imperium (2016), directed by Daniel Ragussis (the book is mentioned as the inspiration for white supremacists)
 Siege by James Mason

References

Bibliography

External links
 "The Turner Legacy" (PDF, 50 pages), International Centre for Counter-Terrorism, The Hague, Netherlands

1978 American novels
American political novels
Antisemitic novels
Antisemitism in the United States
Apocalyptic novels
Conspiracist media
Fictional diaries
Novels about terrorism
Works about white nationalism
Novels by William Luther Pierce
Novels first published in serial form
Neo-Nazism in the United States
Works originally published in American newspapers
Works published under a pseudonym
Right-wing antisemitism
Barricade Books titles
Fiction set in 1999
Novels set in the 2090s
Neo-Nazi propaganda
Neo-Nazism in fiction
White genocide conspiracy theory
Censored books